The 2015 North Norfolk District Council election took place on 7 May 2015 to elect members of the North Norfolk District Council in England. It was held on the same day as other local elections.

Election result

Ward results

References

2011 English local elections
2011
2010s in Norfolk
2015 English local elections
May 2015 events in the United Kingdom